Manoranjan Bhakta (10 April 1939 – 12 June 2015) was an Indian politician and a leader of the Indian National Congress (INC) political party. He was first elected as Member of Parliament for the Andaman and Nicobar Islands in 1977 to the 6th Lok Sabha. In total, he served eight terms as Member of Parliament for this constituency, seven of which were consecutive from 1977–1999. In 2010, after being denied a ticket in an election, he left the INC and later joined the Trinamool Congress.

He studied M.A. and LL.B. from Calcutta University, Calcutta. He was an Agriculturist, Political and Social Worker by profession. He started his political career as a Pradhan of Diglipur Gram Panchayat serving from 1961-71.

Andaman and Nicobar Islands lawyer and journalist Anita Mondal, who is his daughter contested the Andaman and Nicobar Islands seat as Trinamool Congress candidate in the 2014 general election where she finished in fourth place garnering 2,283 votes. She is also a Trinamool Congress councillor in Bidhannagar Municipality.

Notes

External links
 Official biographical sketch in Parliament of India website

1939 births
2015 deaths
Indian National Congress politicians
India MPs 2004–2009
India MPs 1977–1979
India MPs 1980–1984
India MPs 1984–1989
India MPs 1989–1991
India MPs 1991–1996
India MPs 1996–1997
India MPs 1998–1999
Lok Sabha members from the Andaman and Nicobar Islands
Trinamool Congress politicians